Peter Bathurst (1723–1801) was the member of Parliament for the constituency of Eye between 1784 and 1790, and between 1792 and 1795 and a strong supporter of Pitt the Younger.

References 

British MPs 1784–1790
1723 births
1801 deaths
Peter